Space Systems Laboratory is a name commonly used by university laboratories engaged in the research of technologies used for human activities in space.

Examples include:

 Drexel Space Systems Laboratory at the Drexel University in Philadelphia, Pennsylvania, US
 Space Systems Laboratory at the Embry-Riddle Aeronautical University in Prescott, AZ, USA
 Space Systems Laboratory (MIT) at the Massachusetts Institute of Technology  in Cambridge, Massachusetts, US
 this lab was formed at MIT in 1995, after another with the same name moved to UMD
 Space Systems Laboratory at the Tokyo Metropolitan University in Tokyo, Japan
 Space Systems Laboratory at the University of Kentucky in Lexington, KY, USA
 Space Systems Laboratory (Maryland) at the University of Maryland in College Park, MD, USA 
 this lab was originally founded at MIT in 1976 and moved to UMD in 1990
Space Systems Laboratory at the University of Michigan in Ann Arbor, MI, USA
 Space Systems Laboratory at the University of Pisa in Pisa, Italy
 Space Systems Laboratory at the University of Sheffield in Sheffield, England, UK

References